Kato Patisia, also known as Kato Patissia on signage, is on Athens Metro Line 1 in Patisia.

References

Athens Metro stations
Railway stations opened in 1956
1956 establishments in Greece